Ekow Essuman (born 30 March 1989) is a British professional boxer who has held the British and Commonwealth welterweight titles since 2021.

Professional career
Essuman made his professional debut on 1 December 2016, scoring a four-round points decision (PTS) victory against Andrej Cepur at the Holiday Inn, Birmingham, England.

After compiling a record of 8–0 (2 KOs), he faced Andy Keates for the vacant English welterweight title on 20 October 2018 at the Harvey Hadden Sports Village in Nottingham, England. Essuman knocked Keates down twice in the fourth round en route to a fifth-round technical knockout (TKO). He returned to the Harvey Hadden Sports Village for his next fight, successfully defending his English title against former British super-lightweight champion, Tyrone Nurse, via majority decision (MD) on 16 March 2019. Two judges scored the bout in favour of Essuman with 98–93 and 96–94 while the third scored it a draw at 95–95. After a stoppage win over William Warburton in July and a PTS victory over Zygimantas Butkevicius in October, Essuman finished 2019 with a second defence of his title on 30 November, defeating Curtis Felix Jr via eighth-round TKO at the York Hall in London.

Essuman defended his BBBofC British, CBC Commonwealth, and IBF European welterweight belts, against Darren Tetley on 23 April 2022, on the undercard of Tyson Fury vs. Dillian Whyte.

Professional boxing record

References

Living people
1989 births
Botswana male boxers
British male boxers
Welterweight boxers
Light-middleweight boxers
Botswana emigrants to England
English people of Botswana descent
Black British sportspeople